Sacred Citadel is a side-scrolling action brawler video game in the Sacred series. It was released in April 2013, and takes place before the 2014 sequel Sacred 3. It was developed by Southend Interactive and published by Deep Silver for Xbox Live Arcade, PlayStation Network, and Microsoft Windows. A DLC called Sacred Citadel: Jungle Hunt was released on the same month.

Reception

The game received "mixed" reviews on all platforms according to the review aggregation website Metacritic.

References

External links
 Sacred Citadel page at Southend Interactive website
 Sacred Citadel page at Deep Silver website
 

2013 video games
Beat 'em ups
Multiplayer and single-player video games
PlayStation 3 games
PlayStation Network games
Side-scrolling video games
Southend Interactive games
Video games developed in Sweden
Video games featuring female protagonists
Video game prequels
Windows games
Xbox 360 Live Arcade games

Deep Silver games